V-Republic was a 26-episode television series from Ghana which ran from 2014 to 2015. V-Republic started in October 2014 as a web series, director Shirley Frimpong-Manso turned to video-on-demand in search of an audience which crossed national borders in Africa. The series ran until 2015.

It starred Nikki Samonas, Joselyn Dumas, Christabel Ekeh and Jasmine Baroudi. At the 2015 Golden Movie Awards, the performance of Samonas and Baroudi won them nominations for best TV series actress, while Senanu Gbedawo and James Gardner were nominated for best TV series actor. Samonas and Baroudi were again nominated at the 2016 Golden Movie Awards.

Synopsis
The series followed the lives of four professional women from Accra.

Cast 
 Nikki Samonas
 Joselyn Dumas
 Christabel Ekeh
 Jasmine Baroudi

References

External links
 V-Republic, Season 1
 

2014 Ghanaian television series debuts
2015 Ghanaian television series endings
2010s Ghanaian television series
Films directed by Shirley Frimpong-Manso